The Piano Sonata in E-flat minor, Op. 26 was written by Samuel Barber in 1949 for the twenty-fifth anniversary of the League of Composers. Commissioned by Irving Berlin and Richard Rodgers, it was first performed by Vladimir Horowitz and has remained a popular concert staple since.

History
In 1950, the League of Composers, a society aimed at promoting new American works, met for the twenty-fifth anniversary of its inception. Samuel Barber set to work writing a piano sonata for the occasion, and requested Vladimir Horowitz to perform it. His demands were met, and the work was received with overwhelming critical acclaim. Funding for the League of Composers commission was donated by Irving Berlin and Richard Rodgers. Horowitz premiered the Sonata in Havana, Cuba, on December 9, 1949, followed by performances in Cleveland and Washington, DC, before presenting the work at Carnegie Hall on January 23, 1950.

Structure
The sonata is in four movements, and usually takes twenty minutes to perform:

Allegro energico
Allegro vivace e leggero
Adagio mesto
Fuga: Allegro con spirito

Though extremely difficult to execute, the sonata is much more than a virtuosic showpiece. Barber integrated many 20th century musical ideas into the sonata, including extended chromaticism and tone rows.

The first movement begins with a raucous theme, presented in both clefs. Barber's unique use of tone row patterns is immediately prevalent, and it is through these patterns that the contrapuntal and thematic material is developed. The movement ends like it begins, rather abruptly.

The second movement, much lighter in tone than the first, serves somewhat as a scherzo and is far more tonally centered than the first. The opening motif is repeated throughout the entire movement in a variety of patterns and keys, often shifting semi-tonally. Almost as effortlessly as it starts, the second movement drifts off into the third with a high arpeggio.

Like the first movement, the thematic material in the third is presented through tone rows and chromatic figures. The third movement builds up tension through its use of highly dissonant chord progressions, and is much darker than the second.

The fourth movement is a classic fugue of ferocious virtuosity that makes strenuous technical demands of the performer. The main theme of the fugue, a three-bar chromatic syncopated melody, is developed over multiple variations and modulations, moving between hands and, midway through the piece, yielding to a brief E-major interlude with allusions to American Western folk music and Barber's earlier piano composition Excursions. The fugue's lengthy climax restates the main theme in a dazzling cadenza leading to a jazz-tinged block chord quotation and then a restatement in octaves over a striking ostinato motif in the left hand.

Notable recordings
Vladimir Horowitz, released by RCA Victor
Moura Lympany, broadcast live and recorded BBC Maida Vale Studio 2, London, 7 December 1950, released by DECCA Eloquence, "Moura Lympany. The DECCA Years", in 2019
Van Cliburn, released by RCA
Terence Judd, released by Chandos
Marc-André Hamelin, released in August 2004 by Hyperion
John Browning, released by Phoenix USA
Stephen Beus, released by Endeavour Classics
Olga Kern, released by Harmonia Mundi
Daniel Pollack, released by NAXOS Grammy Nomination
Joel Fan, released in April 2009 by Reference Recordings
Leon McCawley, released in January 2010 by Warner Classics
Christopher Atzinger, released by MSR Classics
Isata Kanneh-Mason, released in 2021 by Decca
Willis Delony, released in 1989 by Centaur Records

See also
List of compositions by Samuel Barber

References

Compositions by Samuel Barber
Barber
1949 compositions
Compositions in E-flat minor